is a Japanese television drama series based on the novel by Ayako Miyagi. It premiered on NTV on October 5, 2016, starring Satomi Ishihara in the lead role. Etsuko Kouno takes a job as a proofreader, all the while aspiring to become an editor at her favorite fashion magazine. Etsuko frequently commits gaffes and errors which in the end turn out to be triumphs. The program is unusual in its use of on screen text.

The drama received its highest viewership rating of 13.2%.

A spin-off drama Jimi ni Sugoi! Kōetsu Girl: Kouno Etsuko...ga Inai Suiyōbi is streamed on Hulu with three episodes.

Cast
Main
 Satomi Ishihara as Etsuko Kouno, a proofreader
 Masaki Suda as Yukito Orihara, a novelist
 Tsubasa Honda as Toyoko Morio, an editor of the fashion magazine Lassy
 Munetaka Aoki as Hachirō Kaizuka, an editor of the literary division
 Gorō Kishitani as Shion Takehara, a manager of the proofreading section
 Rika Adachi as Cecil Imai, a receptionist

Guest
 Takeshi Kaga as Daisaku Hongō, a mystery writer (episodes 1 and 7)
 Rie Tomosaka as Aki Komoriya, a blog writer (episode 2)
 Edoardo Sferrella as Cecil Imai's Italian fiance (episode 2)
 Nao Minamisawa as Asuka Sugimoto, an actress (episode 4)
 Hiromi Miyake as herself (episode 6)
 Yoshikazu Ebisu as himself (episode 7)

Episodes

Notes

References

External links
  
 
 

Japanese drama television series
2016 in Japanese television
2016 Japanese television series debuts
2016 Japanese television series endings
Nippon TV dramas
Television shows based on Japanese novels
Television series about journalism